Baker Township is a township in Stevens County, Minnesota, United States. The population was 265 at the 2000 census.

History
Baker Township originally had the name Potsdam Township.

Geography

Demographics
As of the census of 2000, there were 265 people, 61 households, and 43 families residing in the township. The racial makeup of the township was 99.62% White and 0.38% Asian.

There were 61 households, out of which 29.5% had children under the age of 18 living with them, 67.2% were married couples living together, 1.6% had a female householder with no husband present, and 29.5% were non-families. 26.2% of all households were made up of individuals, and 18.0% had someone living alone who was 65 years of age or older. The average household size was 2.62 and the average family size was 3.26.

In the township the population was spread out, with 17.0% under the age of 18, 4.9% from 18 to 24, 13.6% from 25 to 44, 14.3% from 45 to 64, and 50.2% who were 65 years of age or older. The median age was 66 years. For every 100 females, there were 68.8 males. For every 100 females age 18 and over, there were 66.7 males.

The median income for a household in the township was $23,125, and the median income for a family was $31,875. Males had a median income of $35,833 versus $26,250 for females. The per capita income for the township was $14,426. About 24.2% of families and 24.8% of the population were below the poverty line, including 12.9% of those under the age of eighteen and 30.6% of those 65 or over.

References

Townships in Stevens County, Minnesota
Townships in Minnesota